The Party for Freedom and Progress (PVV-PLP) was a liberal political party in Belgium which existed from 1961 until 1992. The party was the successor of the Liberal Party, which had roots dating back to 1846. It was succeeded in the Flemish Community of Belgium by the Flemish Liberals and Democrats (VLD) and in the French Community by the Liberal Reformist Party, Parti des Réformes et des Libertés de Wallonie and the current-day Reformist Movement. In the German-speaking Community, it still exists as the Party for Freedom and Progress.

History

Foundation of a new party

In 1961, Omer Vanaudenhove, leader of the Liberal Party, reorganised it into the Partij voor Vrijheid en Vooruitgang/Parti de la Liberté et du Progrès (PVV/PLP).  The new party, among other things, jettisoned the Liberals' traditional anti-clericalism.  In 1965, the party obtained a victory in the general elections with 21.6% of the votes. In 1966, the PVV joined the government of Paul Vanden Boeynants. The liberal ministers during this period were Willy De Clercq, Jacques Van Offelen, Frans Grootjans, Herman Vanderpoorten, Charles Poswick and August De Winter.

Separation between PVV and PRL

On 27 June 1971, the party was split up in a Flemish (PVV) and Walloon party (the Liberal Reformist Party, PRL). Only a few months later, on 24 September 1971, the parliament was dissolved. In the elections which followed The Flemish PVV gained votes, but the Walloon PRL lost in the elections.

In this period (1971–1992), the PVV ministers in the government were: Willy De Clercq, Herman Vanderpoorten, Herman De Croo, Karel Poma, Alfred Vreven, André Kempinaire, Guy Verhofstadt, Louis Waltniel, Jean Pede, Patrick Dewael, Ward Beysen, and Jacky Buchmann.

The PRL ministers in the government were: André Damseaux, François-Xavier de Donnea, Jean Gol, Louis Olivier, Charles Poswick, and Michel Toussaint.

Flanders: VLD

In Flanders, the PVV ceased to exist in 1992. On 15 November 1992, the Flemish Liberals and Democrats (VLD) was founded.

French-speaking Community: MR

In 1976, the name of the party was changed into Parti de Réformes et de la Liberté en Wallonie (PRLW). In 1979, the name was changed to Liberal Reformist Party (PRL) after the merger with the Liberal Party of Brussels. In March 2002, the PRL merged with the German-speaking Party for Freedom and Progress (PFF) of the East Cantons, the Democratic Front of Francophones (FDF) and the Citizens' Movement for Change (MCC) into the Reformist Movement (MR).

Presidents

Presidents PVV-PLP
 1961 – 1968 : Omer Vanaudenhove
 1968 – 1969 : Norbert Hougardy and Milou Jeunehomme (co-presidency)
 1969 – 1972 : Pierre Descamps

Presidents PVV
 1972 – 1973 : Willy De Clercq
 1973 – 1977 : Frans Grootjans
 1977 – 1982 : Willy De Clercq
 1982 – 1985 : Guy Verhofstadt
 1985 – 1989 : Annemie Neyts
 1989 – 1992 : Guy Verhofstadt

Notable members
 Lucienne Herman-Michielsens (1926–1995)
 Jean Rey (1902–1983), President of the European Commission

Electoral results

Federal Parliament
Chamber

Regional parliaments

Brussels Parliament

European Parliament

See also
 Liberalism in Belgium
 Liberal Archive

Sources
 Liberal Archive 
 History of liberalism in Belgium 
 Th. Luykx, M. Platel, Politieke geschiedenis van België, 2 vol., Kluwer, 1985
 E. Witte, J. Craeybeckx, A. Meynen, Politieke geschiedenis van België, Standaard, 1997

Defunct political parties in Belgium
Conservative liberal parties
Classical liberal parties
Liberal parties in Belgium
1961 establishments in Belgium
1992 disestablishments in Belgium
Political parties established in 1961
Political parties disestablished in 1992